Self Talk is the debut studio album by Australian alt-pop singer songwriter Olympia. The album was released on 29 April 2016 and peaked at number 26 on the ARIA Charts.

Reception

Holly Pereira from Beat Magazine gave the album 4 out of 5 stars calling the album "ambitious" saying "Summing up Olympia is no easy task, with Self Talk exploring many different musical styles and themes to the point that no two tracks sound the same. The experimentation and pop sensibilities intrinsic to Bartley's music are enthralling, distinguishing her as one of the most dynamic performers in Australia at the moment."

Mikey Cahill from Herald Sun gave the album 4.5 out of 5 calling the album "startling" saying "every song is a triple threat of concept, song and execution" and called 'Smoke Signals' the Oz single of the year.

Track listing

Charts

Release history

References

2016 debut albums
Olympia (musician) albums
Albums produced by Burke Reid